Taras Puchkovskyi (born 23 August 1994 in Novovolynsk, Volyn Oblast, Ukraine) is a professional Ukrainian football forward who plays for Epitsentr Kamianets-Podilskyi.

Career
He played for club FC Karpaty Lviv in Ukrainian Premier League.

Puchkovskyi is the product of the UFK Lviv School System. His first trainer was Yaroslav Dmytrasevych. He made his debut for FC Karpaty entering as a second-half substitute against FC Dynamo Kyiv on 14 September 2012 in Ukrainian Premier League.

He also played for Ukrainian under-17 national football team and was called up for other age level representations.

References

External links

1994 births
Living people
Ukrainian footballers
Ukrainian expatriate footballers
FC Karpaty Lviv players
Ukrainian Premier League players
NK Veres Rivne players
FC Poltava players
FC Merani Martvili players
FC Obolon-Brovar Kyiv players
FC Kalush players
Association football defenders
Expatriate footballers in Georgia (country)
Ukrainian expatriate sportspeople in Georgia (country)
Ukraine youth international footballers
Ukraine under-21 international footballers
Ukrainian First League players
Ukrainian Second League players